Our Party, previously known as the Republican People's Party (Partidul Popular Republican, PPR), is a populist political party in Moldova. Founded in 1999 as the Peasants' Christian Democratic Party of Moldova (Partidul Țărănesc Creștin Democrat din Moldova, it promotes economic nationalism, Russophilia, social conservatism, and soft Euroscepticism. Its party chairman is Renato Usatîi, while other key figures include Dumitru Ciubașenco (the party's candidate at 2016 Moldovan presidential election) and Ilian Cașu (the party deputy chairman and 2015 candidate for the function of mayor of Chișinău).

At the 2005 Moldovan parliamentary election, the party won 1.4% of the popular vote but no seats. The 6th National Conference of the Peasants' Christian Democratic Party of Moldova took place on 28 May 2005. The conference decided to change the name of the party to the Republican People's Party and adopted a new status and program. Its chairman became Nicolae Andronic. The party was in opposition to the Party of Communists of the Republic of Moldova (PCRM), who governed until 2009. On 13 April 2014, a party congress took place, in which Andronic ceded leadership to Usatîi, and the party was renamed Our Party. On 10 June 2014, the Ministry of Justice of Moldova announced that it had not recognised this action. On 8 February 2015, the party congress was repeated and the Ministry of Justice approved on 27 February 2015 the modifications to the party program, status, the new name, and new leader.

Election results

Presidential

Parliamentary elections

Local elections

Department and municipality councils

City and countryside councils

Mayors

References

External links
 Official website

2014 establishments in Moldova
Eurosceptic parties in Moldova
Political parties established in 2014
Russian political parties in Moldova